Lois Ruth Boone (born April 26, 1947) is a Canadian politician. She served as MLA for Prince George North from 1986 to 1991, and Prince George-Mount Robson from 1991 to 2001, in the Legislative Assembly of British Columbia. She is a member of the British Columbia New Democratic Party.

Career

Boone held a number of brief positions in the Executive Council of British Columbia, including Minister of Government Services, Minister of Municipal Affairs and Housing and Minister of Transportation and Highways. Later government roles included the Minister for Children and Families and Deputy Premier.

After stepping down from provincial politics, Boone was re-elected as a school trustee for School District #57. In October 2010, she announced she would seek the NDP nomination in the by-election in the federal riding of Prince George-Peace River.

At the November 23, 2010 School District #57 public board meeting, she announced she would not be seeking renewal of her position as vice-chair of the board nor would she be seeking re-election as a trustee. She stated that her decision predated her decision to enter federal politics and was due to the unease she felt over being a part of so many school closure decisions and an unwillingness to continue to "do the government's dirty work".

Federal politics
On May 2, 2011, she was defeated by Conservative Party member, Bob Zimmer, in the federal Canadian election by 62% to 25%.

Partial electoral results

References

1947 births
Living people
British Columbia New Democratic Party MLAs
British Columbia school board members
Women government ministers of Canada
Deputy premiers of British Columbia
Members of the Executive Council of British Columbia
Ministers for children, young people and families
People from Prince George, British Columbia
Politicians from Vancouver
New Democratic Party candidates for the Canadian House of Commons
Women MLAs in British Columbia
21st-century Canadian politicians
21st-century Canadian women politicians